Vaya Con Tioz is the seventh live album and sixth concert film by German rock band Böhse Onkelz. The festival film was recorded during their farewell show "Vaya Con Tioz" from 17 to 18 June 2005 at the Eurospeedway Lausitz, Germany. According to the band, it was the biggest solo rock event of a German rock band. Along with the four DVDs comes a book with many pictures and reports from the concert.

Track listing

DVD 1: Erster Tag (First Day)
Intro 28
10 Jahre (10 Years)
Ich bin in dir (I'm in You)
Kneipenterroristen (Pub Terrorists)
Signum des Verrats (The Sign of Betrayal) 
Ein langer Weg (A Long Way) 
Bomberpilot  (Bomber Pilot)  
Nekrophil (Necrophiliac)
Heute trinken wir richtig (Today We're Gonna Get Drunk)
Falsche Propheten (False Prophets) 
Nenn mich wie du willst (Call Me What You Want) 
Ich lieb mich (I Love Myself)
Keine ist wie du (No one Is Like You) 
Stunde des Siegers (Hour of the Winner)
Mexico
Erinnerungen (Memories)

Extras
Interview
Test: Hier sind die Onkelz (Here Are the Onkelz)
Test: Wieder mal 'nen Tag verschenkt (Another Day Given Away)

DVD 2: Letzter Tag (Last Day)

Documentation
Der letzte Tag (The Last Day)
Dragsterrennen (Dragster Race)
Support Bands
Der letzte Gang (The Last Walk)

Live concert
Intro
Hier sind die Onkelz (Here Are the Onkelz)
Dunkler Ort (Dark Place)
Terpentin (Turpentine)
Fahrt zur Hölle (Go to Hell)
Onkelz vs. Jesus
Entfache dieses Feuer (Candle This Fire)
Die Firma (The Company)
Nichts ist so hart wie das Leben (Nothing Is Harder Than Life)
Leere Worte (Empty Words)
Superstar
Schutzgeist der Scheiße (Patron of Shit)
Narben (Scars)
Onkelz 2000
Keine Amnestie für MTV (No Amnesty for MTV)
Feuer (Fire)
Danke für alles (Schlussansage) (Thanks for All - Last Announcement)
Ihr hättet es wissen müssen (You Should Have Known)
A.D.I.O.Z.
Baja
Abspann (Outro)

DVD 3: Fanz

Making of / Behind-the-scenes
Abschied (Farewell)
Crew
Fanz
Interview
Bühne (Stage)

DVD 4: Support bands

Erster Tag
Wonderfools: Last Night on Earth
Discipline: Nice Boys Finish Last
Sub7even: Raw Like Sushi
D-A-D: Reconstructed
Motörhead: Doctor Rock
Machine Head: The Blood, The Sweat, The Tears

Letzter Tag
Psychopunch: All Over Now
Pro-Pain: Shine
JBO: Ein guter Tag zum Sterben (A Good Day to Die)
In Extremo: Vollmond (Full Moon)
Rose Tattoo: Out of This Place
Children of Bodom: Everytime I Die

Interviews

Bonus songs
Pro-Pain: Terpentin
Sub7even: Ja, Ja
D-A-D: Jihad

Charts

References

Böhse Onkelz live albums
2007 video albums
Live video albums
2007 live albums